Thomas Patrick Stanton  (25 October 1874 – 17 January 1957) was a Major League Baseball catcher. He played for the 1904 Chicago Cubs.

External links

1874 births
1957 deaths
Chicago Cubs players
Major League Baseball catchers
Baseball players from Missouri
San Antonio Missionaries players
Ottumwa Giants players